Jõuga Landscape Conservation Area was a nature park situated in Ida-Viru County, Estonia. From 2021, it is incorporated with Alutaguse National Park.

Its area was 304 ha.

The protected area was designated in 1996 as Kivinõmme Landscape Conservation Area. In 2017, the protected area was named to Jõuga Landscape Conservation Area.

References

Nature reserves in Estonia
Geography of Ida-Viru County